Pharmacognosy Research is a peer-reviewed open-access medical journal published on behalf of the Pharmacognosy Network Worldwide. The journal publishes articles on the subject of pharmacognosy, natural products, and phytochemistry and is indexed with CASPUR, EBSCO, ProQuest, and Scopus.

External links 
 
 Pharmacognosy Network Worldwide

Open access journals
Biannual journals
English-language journals
Pharmacology journals
Publications established in 2007
Medknow Publications academic journals
Pharmacognosy